Maranathinte Nizhalil (In the Shadow of Death) is a novel by Vaikom Muhammad Basheer published in 1951. In this novel, Basheer has not followed his usual style of humour and sarcasm. It is an isolated work because of the subjective presentation of some of the hard experiences of its hero, and its technique resembles more or less the 'stream of consciousness' method.

References

1951 novels
Malayalam novels
Novels by Vaikom Muhammad Basheer
Novels set in Kerala
DC Books books
1951 Indian novels